Ingulf Nossek (14 February 1944 – 19 July 1999) was a German water polo player. He competed in the men's tournament at the 1972 Summer Olympics.

References

1944 births
1999 deaths
German male water polo players
Olympic water polo players of West Germany
Water polo players at the 1972 Summer Olympics
Sportspeople from České Budějovice